Stamford International University Thailand (STIU) is a private for-profit international university with an enrollment of over 4,000 students.

Historical background 
Stamford College was established in Singapore and Malaysia in 1950. Subsequently a campus under the name of Stamford International College was opened in Thailand in 1995 as a joint venture with Far East Stamford International Co. Ltd.

While the institution was started with an English-based international curriculum, parallel courses in Thai language were introduced along the way. Credits can be transferred worldwide to (and from) colleges and universities at the undergraduate and postgraduate levels.

The university established an academic collaboration agreement with Schiller International University of the United States in 2000 and was renamed Schiller-Stamford International College on 2 August 2000. Students at STIU (Cha-am), have an opportunity to study at any of the eight campuses of Schiller in Europe or the United States, through programmes offered under the students exchange agreement between the two universities.

STIU underwent several changes in its name in the process of becoming to a full university, a status which was granted by the Ministry of University Affairs on 14 February 2003, resulting in a renaming to Schiller-Stamford International University. STIU achieved autonomy on 26 May 2004 and was re-branded as Stamford International University.

On 29 September 2008, STIU underwent a re-branding programme, including the logo, the symbol, official colours and motto.

The Laureate partnership 
In late-2011, STIU became a partner of Laureate International Universities, an academic network of 60 universities in 29 countries serving more than 675,000 students around the world.

STIU currently has students from as many as 56 countries. On 13 February 2019, it was announced that Laureate divested the entirety of its 100% shares to China YuHua Education Corporation Limited for approximately US$28 million.

Undergraduate programs 
 Faculty of Business Administration (BBA degree)
 Faculty of Liberal Arts (BA degree)
 Faculty of Science and Technology (BSc degree)

Graduate programs 
 Master of Business Administration (MBA) - both international (English) and Thai programs
 Master of Public Administration (MPA) - Thai programme only

Laureate English program 
The Laureate English Programme (LEP) co-developed by three leaders in the field of English Language teaching: Cambridge University Press, University of Cambridge ESOL Examinations, and the Bell Education Trust, has been created to equip graduates with the requisite language skills.

Main campus (Hua Hin) 
The Stamford Thailand main campus is in the Cha-am District, in the area of Hua Hin, 168 kilometres southwest of Bangkok on a 100 Rai (unit)rai (16 ha) campus.

Since 2008, only Thai language-based courses are taught here.

Rama 9 campus (Bangkok) 
Stamford International University opened a second campus in Bangkok on 27 November 2008 for international programmes (taught in English). This campus is close to the airport link road. Prior to the launch of this city campus, Stamford used to hold classes for master's degree courses at a study center in central Bangkok on Sukhumvit Road.

Accreditation
Stamford International University and its programmes, curricula, and degrees are fully accredited by the Ministry of Education (MoE) and the Ministry of University Affairs (MUA) of Thailand. It is listed on the MUA's List of Recognised Private Universities.

References

External links 
 Ministry of Education (MoE)
Ministry of University Affairs (MUA)

Educational institutions established in 1995
Universities and colleges in Bangkok
Private universities and colleges in Thailand
International universities
1995 establishments in Thailand
Universities in Thailand